The NAVWAR Space Field Activity (NSFA) is one of three Echelon III activities under the Naval Information Warfare Systems Command (NAVWARSYSCOM) of the United States Navy, co-located with the National Reconnaissance Office (NRO) in Chantilly, Virginia. 

The activity was established to coordinate naval space and warfare systems activities within the National Reconnaissance Office. NSFA personnel provide naval warfare and acquisition expertise to national reconnaissance programs, coordinate naval space research, development, and acquisition activities with those same national reconnaissance programs, and provide and coordinate training and tools to enable the fleet to use national space capabilities.

References

External links

United States Navy installations
Military intelligence
Military in Virginia